Uluberia subdivision is a subdivision of the Howrah district in the state of West Bengal, India. It consists of Uluberia municipality and nine community development (CD) blocks, including 90 gram panchayats and six census towns. The six census towns are: Khalor, Bagnan, Naupala, Santoshpur, Balaram Pota and Uttar Pirpur. The subdivision has its headquarters at Uluberia. The whole division forms the Lok Sabha constituency of Uluberia.

Area

Legislative segments
The whole of Uluberia subdivision elects to the  Uluberia constituency of the Lok Sabha.  There are 7 constituencies for the West Bengal Legislative Assembly (Vidhan Sabha). The Uluberia Uttar constituency will be reserved for Scheduled castes (SC) candidates.

 Uluberia Purba (assembly constituency no. 176) - Uluberia municipality area and the gram panchayats of Khalisani and Raghudevpur under the Uluberia-II block
 Uluberia Uttar (SC) (assembly constituency no. 179) - the other six gram panchayats under the Uluberia-II block and eight gram panchayats under the Amta-I block: Amta, Bhandargachha, Chandrapur, Khardah, Raspur, Sirajbati, Udang-I and Udang-II
 Uluberia Dakshin (assembly constituency no. 180) - The Uluberia-I block and the gram panchayats of Belari, Dhandali, Balichaturi and Nabagram under the Shyampur-I block
 Shyampur (assembly constituency no. 181) - formed from the Shyampur-II CD block, and the other six gram panchayats under the Shyampur-I block
 Bagnan (assembly constituency no. 182) - formed from the whole Bagnan-II block, and the following gram panchayats of Bagnan-I: Bangalpur, Haturia-I, Haturia-II and Khalore
 Amta (assembly constituency no. 183) - formed from Amta-II and the other four gram panchayats under the Bagnan-I CD block
 Udaynarayanpur (assembly constituency no. 184) - formed from the Udaynarayanpur CD block, and from the other five gram panchayats from Amta I

References

Subdivisions of West Bengal
Subdivisions in Howrah district
Howrah district